Michael Bowen may refer to:

 Michael Bowen (actor) (born 1953), American film and television actor
 Michael Bowen (artist) (1937–2009), American artist
 Michael Bowen (bishop) (1930–2019), British Roman Catholic archbishop